The women's 400 metre freestyle was a swimming event held as part of the swimming at the 1924 Summer Olympics programme. It was the first appearance of the event, in 1920 a 300 metre race was contested. The competition was held from Sunday July 13, 1924, to Tuesday July 15, 1924.

Records
These were the standing world and Olympic records (in minutes) prior to the 1924 Summer Olympics.

In the first heat Gertrude Ederle set the first Olympic record for this event with 6:12.2 minutes. In the final Martha Norelius won with the new Olympic record of 6:02.2 minutes.

Results

Heats

Sunday July 13, 1924: The fastest two in each heat and the fastest third-placed from across the heats advanced.

Heat 1

Heat 2

Heat 3

Heat 4

Semifinals

Monday July 14, 1924: The fastest two in each semi-final and the faster of the two third-placed swimmer advanced to the final.

Semifinal 1

Semifinal 2

Final

Tuesday July 15, 1924:

References

External links
Olympic Report
 

Swimming at the 1924 Summer Olympics
1924 in women's swimming
Women's events at the 1924 Summer Olympics